Shawn Christopher is a female African-American house-music singer from Chicago, Illinois.

Career
She was a touring backing vocalist for R&B singer Chaka Khan, from 1982 to 1985. She was also a member of the industrial dance band known as My Life with the Thrill Kill Kult, and sang with the group Sonia Dada. She is the sister of the R&B singer, keyboardist and producer Gavin Christopher.

She sang lead vocals on a song by DJ/producer Lil Louis titled "French Kiss" in 1989. The song became a #1 hit on the Billboard Hot Dance Club Play chart that year.

During the 1990s, she also scored three #1 singles on the Hot Dance Club Play chart in her own right: "Another Sleepless Night", in 1991 (which also reached #67 on the Billboard Hot 100 chart, and #50 on the UK Singles Chart); "Don't Lose the Magic", in 1992 (which peaked at #71 on the Hot 100, and UK chart #30); and "Sweet Freedom", in 1998. In addition, she sang backing vocals on Jimmy Somerville's #1 Hot Dance Club Play track from 1995, "Heartbeat".

She also recorded a song titled "Thinking About the Way" in the early 1990s and reached #57 in the UK in 1994 with "Make My Love".

See also
List of number-one dance hits (United States)
List of artists who reached number one on the US Dance chart

References

African-American musicians
American rhythm and blues musicians
American dance musicians
American house musicians
Arista Records artists
Singers from Chicago
Living people
My Life with the Thrill Kill Kult members
Year of birth missing (living people)